The Mass of the Presanctified (Latin: missa præsanctificatorum, Greek: leitourgia ton proegiasmenon) is Christian liturgy traditionally celebrated on Good Friday in which the consecration is not performed. Instead, the Blessed Sacrament that was consecrated at an earlier Mass and reserved is distributed. 

The liturgy had developed by the time of the Quinisext Council (Second Trullan Synod, 692). In the Roman and Anglican Rites it is used only on Good Friday, while in some Old Catholic Rites it is used on both Good Friday and Holy Saturday.

In both the Ordinary and the Extraordinary Form of the Roman Rite, the term "Mass of the Presanctified" is not used in the Missal and other liturgical books, the ceremony having been retitled Solemn Afternoon Liturgy of the Passion and Death of the Lord (Solemnis actio liturgica postmeridiana in Passione et Morte Domini) in the 1955 revisions of Pope Pius XII. It is also called the Solemn Commemoration of the Lord's Passion.

The Divine Liturgy of the Presanctified Gifts is used in the Eastern Orthodox Church and those Eastern Catholic Churches which follow the Byzantine Rite only on the weekdays (Monday through Friday) of Great Lent, and on Monday through Wednesday of Holy Week. At each of these Presanctified Liturgies, the Sacred Mysteries (Blessed Sacrament) would have been consecrated the previous Sunday.

See also
 Missa Sicca
 Eucharistic adoration
 Eucharistic reservation

References

Catholic liturgical rites
Holy Week